The 1959 Florida Gators football team represented the University of Florida during the 1959 NCAA University Division football season. The season was Bob Woodruff's tenth and last year as the head coach of the Florida Gators football team. The Gators celebrated a close conference win over the Mississippi State Maroons (14–13), and suffered close conference defeats to the Vanderbilt Commodores (6–13), the top-ranked LSU Tigers (0–9) and the eighth-ranked Auburn Tigers (0–6). Woodruff finished his tenure on a high note, with the Gators' victories over the Florida State Seminoles (18–8) and the twelfth-ranked Miami Hurricanes (23–14), their primary in-state rivals. Woodruff's 1959 Florida Gators finished with an overall record of 5–4–1 and a Southeastern Conference (SEC) record of 2–4, placing ninth among twelve SEC teams.

Schedule

Postseason
Despite having returned the Gators to competitive respectability within the Southeastern Conference (SEC) in his ten seasons as the Gators' coach and athletic director, University of Florida president J. Wayne Reitz declined to renew Woodruff's contract in 1959 after two previous contract extensions. Woodruff returned to the University of Tennessee, his alma mater, in 1963, where he became the long-time athletic director of the Tennessee Volunteers sports program. During the 1950s, the Gators compiled an overall record of 53–42–6 (.555) during the decade.

References

Florida
Florida Gators football seasons
Florida Gators football